HMS Speedy was a  of the British Royal Navy. She was built by Thornycroft from 1892–1894. She was converted to a minesweeper in 1908–1909 and continued these duties during the First World War. Speedy was sunk by a German mine on 3 September 1914.

Design and construction
The Alarms were slightly modified  versions of the previous Sharpshooter-class, with modified engines to improve reliability.

Speedy differed from other ships of her class in having eight Thornycroft water-tube boilers rather than the locomotive boilers used for the rest of the class, with three funnels being fitted instead of two. The revised machinery arrangements were much more reliable and made it easier to maintain high speed.

The ship was armed with two 4.7 inch (120 mm) QF guns mounted fore and aft on the ships centreline, backed up by four 3-pounder (47 mm) guns (two in single mounts on the ship's beam and two in casemates forward) and a single .45-inch Gardner machine gun. Three 18-inch (450 mm) torpedo tubes were fitted, with one fixed in the ship's bow and the other two on swivelling mounts on the beam. The ship had a crew of 91.

Speedy was laid down at Thornycroft's Chiswick shipyard on 4 January 1892 and was launched on 18 May 1893. She reached a speed of  during sea trials, when her engines delivered . The ship was completed on 20 February 1894.

Service
Speedy was subject to extensive tests of her boilers, which proved successful, demonstrating the reliability and performance of water-tube boilers, helping to pave the way for more widespread use of these boilers by the Royal Navy.

In August 1894 Speedy took part in that year's Naval Manoeuvres, In January 1896 Speedy served as despatch vessel to the Channel Squadron, and in July 1896 again took part in the Manoeuvres, On 26 June 1897 Speedy was present at the Jubilee Fleet Review at Spithead, following that by taking part in the Naval Manoeuvres that July.

In 1898, Speedy was deployed to Gibraltar, but was forced to return to Britain to have her boilers re-tubed after suffering problems on the journey out. She later returned to the Mediterranean, where she stayed until returning to Home waters in 1905. Lieutenant William Frederick Blunt was appointed in command on 4 July 1902, and in November that year she travelled to Port Said and through the Suez Canal for a visit to Suez, Suakin, Perim, Hodeida and Aden.

In 1906 Speedy was deployed on Coastguard duties at Harwich, and collided with a merchant ship in June that year. Speedy joined the Home Fleet in 1907, and in 1909 was attached to the Nore destroyer flotilla.

Speedy was converted to a minesweeper in 1909, which involved removing the torpedo tubes. She had her boilers re-tubed in 1911, rejoining the Nore division of the Home Fleet after this refit was complete.

First World War
After investigation, it was found that the "hostile cruiser" was in fact Speedy.

On the night of 25 August 1914, the German minelayer , accompanied by the light cruiser  and the torpedo-boats of the 3rd Half Flotilla, laid a minefield off the mouth of the Humber estuary, while  laid another minefield off the River Tyne. When the minefield was discovered, Speedy and the gunboat  were ordered to clear the minefield off the Humber. On 2 September 1914, Speedy accompanied the drifter Eyrie  and two other trawlers to sweep the Humber minefield when Eyrie struck a mine and sunk, killing six of her crew. The next day, Speedy and the drifters Lindsell, Wishful and Achievable were again sweeping the Humber field when Lindsell struck a mine and sank, killing five. Speedy lowered boats to rescue the survivors of Lindsells crew, but struck a mine herself, sinking an hour later. One of Speedys crew was killed. The loss of three minesweepers in two days resulted in the Admiralty changing its policy on dealing with minefields – rather than clear entire minefields,  clear channels would be swept through minefields to give a safe route for shipping.

References

Bibliography

 

Alarm-class torpedo gunboats
1893 ships
Maritime incidents in September 1914
Ships sunk by mines
World War I shipwrecks in the North Sea